Similosodus birmanicus is a species of beetle in the family Cerambycidae. It was described by Stephan von Breuning in 1938, originally under the genus Sodus.

References

birmanicus
Beetles described in 1938